The Elbe Evangelical Lutheran Church (also known as the Little White Church of Elbe) is a small church in Elbe, Pierce County, Washington, USA.  The church has been listed by sources, including Ripley's Believe It or Not!, as the world's smallest functional church.

Chronological History
1888:  Carl “Charles” Elbe Lutkens (1869-1950) & Adams Sachs (1858-1921) homesteaded Elbe along the Nisqually River.  They named the town after the Elbe River in Hamburg, Germany from where Lutkens had emigrated.

1891:  Heinrich “Henry” C. Lutkens (1832-1919), his wife Christine Böttcher Lutkens (1848-1933) & their other children settled in Elbe.  

1892:  The Elbe Post Office was established.

1893:  Pastor Dr. Lewis Herman Schuh (1858-1936; of Tacoma’s German Evangelical Trinity Church) traveled to Elbe to organize the Elbe Evangelical Lutheran Church congregation & to hold its first services in the Elbe Town Hall.

1895-1905:  Pastor J. F. Oertel (of Puyallup) led worship services in homes in Elbe.

1903:  Sachs platted the town of Elbe.

1904:  The Tacoma Eastern Railroad reached Elbe.  H. Lutkens donated the land for its depot.

1904-1905:  H. Lutkens platted additions to the town of Elbe

1906:  It was built 24’ long x 18’ wide.  Its 44’ tall steeple (housing a railroad locomotive bell) is topped with a 4’ tall iron cross.  H. Lutkens donated the land & lumber for its construction; and served as a deacon.  Pastor Karl Kilian (1869-1945) designed, built & dedicated it; and then was its first pastor.

1926:  The Mountain Highway (Highway 7) was paved from Tacoma to Mt. Rainier National Park’s Nisqually entrance.

1930:  Services in German ended.

1933:  Kilian retired after being its pastor for 27 years.

1944:  Lake Alder was formed behind it when the Alder Dam was completed on the Nisqually River.

1973:  Rev. Dr. Ervin E. Krebs (of Tacoma) reinstituted monthly worship services.

Oct 8, 1976:  It was placed on the National Register of Historic Places.

July 1, 1984:  Bishop Clifford Rolf Lunde (1930-1987) became it honorary pastor; it therefore became a cathedral (the seat of the bishop); and its “pfaarhaus” (fellowship house) was dedicated next door.

2015-2021:  Pastor Margaret O’Neal served as its most recent pastor.

References

Sources
 Filley, Bette (1996). The Big Fact Book About Mount Rainier, Dunamis House, .

External links

German-American culture in Washington (state)
Lutheran churches in Washington (state)
National Register of Historic Places in Pierce County, Washington
Churches completed in 1906
Churches in Pierce County, Washington
Churches on the National Register of Historic Places in Washington (state)
Roadside attractions in Washington (state)
1906 establishments in Washington (state)